Walther Meier (born 28 August 1910) was a Swiss field hockey player who competed in the 1936 Summer Olympics. In 1936 he was a member of the Swiss team which was eliminated in the group stage of the Olympic tournament. He played all three matches as halfback or forward.

External links
 
Walther Meier's profile at Sports Reference.com

1910 births
Year of death missing
Swiss male field hockey players
Olympic field hockey players of Switzerland
Field hockey players at the 1936 Summer Olympics